Holocraspedon bilineata is a moth of the family Erebidae first described by George Hampson in 1901. It is found in Singapore, Thailand and the north-eastern Himalayas, as well as on Peninsular Malaysia, Borneo, Sulawesi and Sumbawa. The habitat consists of lowland forests and wet heath forests.

The ground colour of the forewings is fawn with a distinctive pattern of dark brown markings.

References

Lithosiini
Moths described in 1901